Following is the discography of American R&B/soul vocal group The O'Jays.

Albums

Studio albums

Live albums

Compilation albums

Singles

The early years

 Singles credited to The Mascots

The Philadelphia International era

The later years

References

Discographies of American artists
Rhythm and blues discographies
Soul music discographies
Disco discographies